Delroy is a masculine Jamaican given name. Notable people with the first name include:

Delroy Allen (born 1954), retired Jamaican-American soccer goalkeeper
Delroy Cambridge (born 1949), Jamaican professional golfer
Delroy Chuck, Jamaican lawyer, journalist and politician
Delroy Clarke (born 1982), Canadian football cornerback
Delroy Denton, Jamaican-born illegal immigrant to Britain and convicted rapist and murderer
Delroy Edwards (1959–2005), Jamaican-born refugee, refused political asylum in UK, killed by a gang following his return
Delroy Edwards (musician) (born 1990), stage name of American electronic record producer Brandon Avery Perlman
Delroy Facey (born 1980), British-Grenadian professional footballer
Delroy Garrett, fictional superhero published by Marvel Comics
Delroy Grant (born 1957), Jamaican-born British convicted serial rapist
Delroy Leslie (born 1970), retired boxer from Jamaica
Delroy Lindo (born 1952), British-born Jamaican American actor
Delroy McLean, birth name of Bitty McLean
Delroy Parkes, British retired boxer
Delroy McQueen, former English weightlifter and powerlifter
Delroy Pearson (born 1970), British singer and a member of the pop group Five Star
Delroy Poyser (born 1962), retired long jumper from Jamaica
Delroy Wilson (1948–1995), Jamaican ska, rocksteady and reggae singer
Delroy Washington (1952–2020), Jamaican-British reggae singer
Delroy "Del" Bryan (born 1967), British former boxer
Delroy Taylor (born 1975), Jamaican former cricketer
Delroy Scott (1947–2018), Jamaican footballer
Delroy Slowley, Jamaican politician
Delroy Morgan (born 1967), Jamaican cricketer
Delroy Fraser, Guyanese professional footballer

See also
Tony Delroy, Australian radio presenter and host of Nightlife on ABC Local Radio